Babymetal is the debut studio album by Japanese heavy metal idol group Babymetal. Music from the album dates back to the origins of the band in 2010, and incorporates tracks from their earliest released singles, back when the band was a sub-unit of the Japanese idol group Sakura Gakuin.

Babymetal received generally positive reviews from music critics. The album managed to peak at number four on the Oricon Weekly Chart, and has since been certified gold with over 100,000 copies sold in Japan. In the United States, the album debuted at number 187 on the Billboard 200—a rarity for Japanese acts in the country—and managed to top the World Albums chart. Two singles from Babymetal, "Ijime, Dame, Zettai" and "Megitsune", gained domestic success, charting within the top ten in Japan. "Gimme Chocolate!!" became an international success, with its music video garnering attention overseas and becoming the group's most viewed music video on YouTube.

Background 
Prior to the album's release, Babymetal performed as a sub-unit for the Japanese idol group Sakura Gakuin from 2010 to 2013, and music that would be included surfaced as early as October 30, 2010, when the members of the band recorded their vocals for their first song "Doki Doki ☆ Morning". From 2011 to 2013, the band released five singles inside and outside Sakura Gakuin, with the most successful single, "Ijime, Dame, Zettai" peaking at number six on the Oricon Weekly Singles chart.

From late 2012 to early 2013, Babymetal took part in a series of headlining shows, performing new songs in each performance. The band then embarked on their first tour, the Babymetal Death Match Tour 2013: May Revolution, in May 2013, and later performed two more headlining shows that year, each performed near the members' birthdays. At the end of the latter show, Legend "1997", the band announced a pair of shows to occur at Nippon Budokan, as well as an album slated for release on February 26, 2014, with a standard edition and a limited edition bundled with a DVD.

Composition 

Musically, the album follows Babymetal's fusion of J-pop and heavy metal (referred to as kawaii metal), at times incorporating elements of bubblegum pop, hip hop, drum and bass, and dubstep. The opening track "Babymetal Death" is an instrumental speed metal track, with frequent shouts of "Death!", while "Gimme Chocolate!!" features "thrashing, grating guitars" that alternate with "speed-sung, quirky lyrics". Songs like "Megitsune" and "Iine!" are notable for their sudden genre shifts, while the Su-metal solo "Rondo of Nightmare" is described as a powerful cacophony. The Black Babymetal song "Song 4" incorporates elements of reggae, while "Catch Me If You Can" contains elements of "digi-rock" (digital rock) and industrial metal. "Ijime, Dame, Zettai" begins with a mellow intro transitioning to speed metal.

Lyrically, the songs of the album are in Japanese, and focus on issues for young girls, like acceptance and standing up for one's self. "Megitsune" is about women who hide their emotions like a kitsune (fox), which serves as the band's signature hand gesture. "Gimme Chocolate!" talks about girls who like to eat chocolate, while dealing with the worry of weight gain, while "Iine!" emphazises the band's desire "to establish a fun, aggressive, new genre in music". "Doki Doki ☆ Morning" and "Uki Uki ★ Midnight" are described as two sides of a day, and as such describe the contrasting times of a girl's life. "Catch Me If You Can" has a more comical theme of hide and seek with concepts of Japanese namahage. "Headbangeeeeerrrrr!!!!!" tells the story of a girl's first experience at a concert, while "Ijime, Dame, Zettai" is an anti-bullying theme.

According to Nakamoto, the meanings behind lyrics of the songs did not immediately become recognized by the members of the band, but this would later be mitigated after performing the tracks live in concert. After the album gained international attention, Nakamoto has mentioned how a girl from the United Kingdom sent a letter about how "Ijime, Dame, Zettai" helped her deal with school bullies, and further said,

"Despite the fact that we sing in Japanese, so many people around the world have reached out to us and that encourages us to keep doing what we are doing right now. We are definitely happy that we've been able to help our fans in any way we can."

Release and promotion 
On January 25, 2014, the title was confirmed, and the track listing revealed three new songs and ten found on the band's previous singles. On February 4, 2014, the artwork was revealed for both editions, and a promotional video featuring five songs from the album was posted on YouTube, along with a teaser for a live music clip of "Gimme Chocolate!!". To commemorate the release day of the album, Tower Records Shinjuku sold "Festival of 25" merchandise, with the store ultimately selling over 1,000 copies. The album was also released in a special limited edition titled Babymetal Apocalypse Limited Edition, exclusively for members of the group's "Babymetal Apocalypse Web" fansite, and in a CD format with alternate versions of two of the songs.

On July 26, 2014, the band re-released the limited edition version with a special cover to commemorate the band's 2014 world tour. In mid-2015, the album was re-released worldwide under different record labels with two bonus tracks: the new song "Road of Resistance" and a live performance of "Gimme Chocolate!!" from O2 Academy Brixton. When asked about the re-release, Nakamoto explained,
"Obviously, we don't come to America often. It's very difficult, you know, schedule-wise and everything. With this album finally being physically available here, I feel that, hopefully, the album will be the medium that keeps the fans close to us. They will finally be able to hold it in their hands. Even though we're so far away, this album's going to connect us with fans again and we just want to keep that relationship going."

Tour 

Shortly after the release of the album, the band performed two shows at Nippon Budokan to a sold out audience, where they performed all songs from the album with their accompanying band, Kami Band. After the end of the second show, the band announced two shows to be performed later in the year in Europe, which was later revealed to be a part of the band's first world tour, the Babymetal World Tour 2014. In 2015, the band embarked on the Babymetal World Tour 2015, with more tour dates in North America and Europe.

Singles and other songs 
Prior to the release of the album, Babymetal had released five singles, from 2011 to 2013. The first single, "Doki Doki ☆ Morning", initially appeared on the Sakura Gakuin debut album Sakura Gakuin 2010 Nendo: Message, before being released independently on October 22, 2011. "Babymetal / Kiba of Akiba", a joint single with the band Kiba of Akiba, was released on March 7, 2012, featuring the Babymetal song "Iine!". "Headbangeeeeerrrrr!!!!!" was released on July 4, 2012 and included a neck corset on the limited editions. "Ijime, Dame, Zettai" was the first major label single released on January 7, 2013, but did not appear in the annually released Sakura Gakuin albums. "Megitsune" was released as the second major label single on June 19, 2013, and is the first song released after the split from Sakura Gakuin.

Prior to the international release of the album, a sixth single, "Road of Resistance", was released digitally on February 1, 2015. "Gimme Chocolate!!", although not initially released as a single, brought the band and the album to international success; the song peaked at number 5 on the Billboard World Digital Songs chart in the United States and its live music video performance at the concert Legend "1997" Su-metal Seitansai has garnered over 100 million views as of July 4, 2019. The song was later released as a digital single by earMusic on May 31, 2015.

Reception

Critical reception 

Babymetal received acclaim from Japanese critics. Kazumi Nanba from Rolling Stone Japan positively reviewed the album, calling "Song 4" a highlight and calling the work filled with elements of "quality, heaviness, humor, and cuteness", and a unified masterpiece that can no doubt be representative of the year 2014. Patrick St. Michel of The Japan Times described the album as a "less cynical, more pop friendly version of Maximum the Hormone’s last album, Yoshu Fukushu, and credited the band members and musicians for a "solid album", and noted that the album was most successful when the band "ditches the gimmicks", calling "Gimme Chocolate!!" "extremely catchy".

The album also received positive reception internationally. Tim Sendra from Allmusic gave the album four and a half stars out of five stating: "It's clearly not an album for metalheads who like to follow the clear definitions of what makes metal metal, or one for J-pop fans who are scared of huge guitar riffs. But those who don't really care about rules and just want to jump around like idiots to the brightest, silliest music imaginable will find exactly what they never dreamed about asking for in Babymetal's brilliant debut." Sarah O'Connor from Rock Sound wrote that the album was "oodles of fun" and "completely and utterly absurd, but when has that ever been a bad thing?" Paul Travers of Kerrang! called the music "cynical and fabricated", yet "utterly brilliant". Recommending the songs, "Headbangeeeeerrrrr!!!!!" and "Catch Me If You Can", he stated that the band is using the "fine line between genius and insanity […] as a skipping rope". Tristan Peterson from Metal Obsession stated, "This band was created for the demographic of “Music that your Japanese Boyfriend/Girlfriend, who doesn’t really like Metal, would enjoy.” He continued saying, "This is a unique album from a unique band that has not compromised on their intent, and that is to create a charming, and pretty damn heavy, dichotomy of sound for you to enjoy. It has made metal cute without losing any of its edge and that is not something you can say about, well, any band." The album also received attention from western journalists like Brian Mansfield of USA Today.

Accolades
In July 2016, Metal Hammer readers voted Babymetal as the best album of the 21st century. IN December 2014, PopMatters called it the fourteenth best metal album of 2014. In November 2019, Loudwire called it the forty-first best metal album of the decade.

Commercial performance 
Babymetal peaked at number four on the Oricon Weekly Albums chart for the week of March 10, 2014 with first-week sales of 37,463 copies, and number one on the Oricon Daily Albums chart on March 1, 2014. The album also peaked at number two on the Billboard Japan Top Albums Sales chart, with first-week sales of 31,000 copies. In the United States, the album peaked at number 187 on the Billboard 200 for the week of March 22, 2014, and number four on the Billboard Heatseekers chart. In the United Kingdom, the album peaked at number 103 on the Official Albums Chart. Additionally, the album peaked at number 35 on the US iTunes album chart, and at number one on the iTunes metal charts in the United States, Canada, and the United Kingdom.

In December 2014, Babymetal was certified Gold by the Recording Industry Association of Japan for more than 100,000 physical copies shipped to stores.

Track listing 

Notes
A. "Kitsune of Metal God" refers to a god figure frequently mentioned in band materials and interviews (often as "Kitsune-sama" or the "Fox God"). Official credits under this name are registered to Kobametal.
B. Nakametal is written as ナカメタル in the credits of "Doki Doki ☆ Morning" and "Headbangeeeeerrrrr!!!!!".
 "Babymetal Death" and "Catch Me If You Can" (Japanese edition only) are stylized as "BABYMETAL DEATH" and "Catch me if you can", respectively.
 "Song 4" lists its credits for lyrics and music as Black Babymetal, the stage name for the duo of Yuimetal and Moametal without Su-metal.
 Herman Li and Sam Totman appear on "Road of Resistance", and are featured artists on the United Kingdom digital release.
 Commentary audio tracks are included for music videos on the Japanese limited edition DVD.
 "Gimme Chocolate!!" (World Tour 2015 edition) includes highlights of the Babymetal World Tour 2015.

Personnel 
Credits adapted from Babymetal album liner notes, Sakura Gakuin 2010 Nendo: Message album liner notes, "Babymetal / Kiba of Akiba" single cover notes, "Headbangeeeeerrrrr!!!!!" single liner notes, "Ijime, Dame, Zettai" standard and limited "I" single liner notes, "Megitsune" standard and limited "Tsu" single liner notes, Metal Resistance liner notes, and Google Play.

Recording and management
 Recorded at S.O.L.I.D. Sound Lab, Heartbeat Recording Studio, MukuStudio, Sound Arts Studio, Wacken Open Studio, and ABS Recording
 Mixed at S.O.L.I.D. Sound Lab, Heartbeat Recording Studio, Art Pop Entertainment, Hama Shobo Studio, and King Sekiguchidai Studio
 Mastered at Form the Master and Parasight Mastering

Personnel

 Suzuka Nakamoto (Su-metal) – vocals
 Yui Mizuno (Yuimetal) – vocals, lyrics, music
 Moa Kikuchi (Moametal) – vocals, lyrics, music
 Key Kobayashi (Kobametal / Kxbxmetal / Kitsune of Metal God) – lead producer, management, lyrics, music, arrangement
 Millennium Japan – producer
 Miki Watanabe (Mk-metal) – lyrics
 Norikazu Nakayama (Norimetal / Nakata Caos / Nakametal) – lyrics, music
 Tatsuya Tsubono (Tsubometal) – lyrics, music
 Ryugi Yokoi (Ryu-metal) – lyrics
 Shinichi Fujita (Fuji-metal) – lyrics
 Shion Hirota (Edometal) – lyrics
 Takehiro Mamiya (Yuyoyuppe) – lyrics, production, samples, arrangement, programming, sound design, field recording, guitar, audio mixing
 Takeshi Ueda – music, arrangement
 Nobuaki Miyasaka (Mish-Mosh) – music
 Sari Miyasaka (Mish-Mosh) – music
 Norizo – music
 Motonari Murakawa – music, arrangement
 Shuhei Takahashi (Team-K) – music
 Kazuki Higashihara (Team-K) – music
 Nobuki Narasaki – music
 Takeru Youda (Takemetal) – music
 Keiji Kusama (Kyt-metal) – music
 Daiki Kasho – arrangement, audio engineer
 Kyoto – arrangement
 SOH (O! S-D) – arrangement, guitar
 Tatsuo – arrangement, programming, guitar, bass
 Narametal – arrangement
 Herman Li – guitar
 Sam Totman – guitar
 Leda – bass

Production

 Chibametal – executive producer
 Inabametal – executive producer
 Takehiro Mamiya – co-producer
 Hitometal – management
 Seiji Toda – recording, audio mixing
 Masatake Osato – recording
 Naoki Ibaraki – recording
 Hironobu Takikawa – audio mixing
 Yasuhisa Kataoka – audio engineer
 Motohiro Tsuji – mastering
 Tucky – mastering
 Yuji Nakamura – assistant engineer
 Shimon Tanaka – art direction, illustration, design
 Yoko Nakajima (SMC) – art work coordination
 Derametal – A&R director
 Akimetal – A&R promotion
 Tackmetal – sales promotion

Charts

Weekly charts

Year-end charts

Certifications

Release history

References

External links 
 Regular edition profile on Oricon website 
 
 
 

Babymetal albums
2014 debut albums
Toy's Factory albums
Japanese-language albums
Kawaii metal albums